The Life of Joseph W. McVey is the eighth solo studio album by American rapper Z-Ro. It was released on February 24, 2004 through Rap-A-Lot 4 Life/J. Prince Entertainment with distribution via Asylum Records. Recording sessions took place at Dean's List House Of Hits in New York City, at Noddfactor Studios in Denton, and at M.A.D. Studios in Houston. Production was handled by Mike Dean, Mr. Lee, Bigg Tyme, Sean "Solo" Jemison and Tone Capone. It features guest appearances from Trae tha Truth, Scarface and Tanya Herron. The album peaked at number 170 on the Billboard 200 in the United States.

The track "I Hate U Bitch" was released as a single and reached number 75 on the Billboard Hot R&B/Hip-Hop Songs chart.

Track listing

Charts

References

External links

Z-Ro albums
2004 albums
Rap-A-Lot Records albums
Albums produced by Mike Dean (record producer)